Royal Peninsula is a private housing estate in Hung Hom, Kowloon Peninsula, Hong Kong, which was jointly developed by Sun Hung Kai Properties and Henderson Land Development in 2001. Built on the reclaimed land of Hung Hom Bay, it comprises 5 high-rise buildings with 1669 units and consists 13 penthouse apartments on the top floors.

Education
Royal Peninsula is in Primary One Admission (POA) School Net 35. Within the school net are multiple aided schools (operated independently but funded with government money) and Ma Tau Chung Government Primary School (Hung Hom Bay).

Gallery

See also
 Hung Hom station
 Harbour Place
 The Harbourfront Landmark

References

External links

Official website of Royal Peninsula

Buildings and structures completed in 2001
Hung Hom
Private housing estates in Hong Kong
Sun Hung Kai Properties
Henderson Land Development